The Weir Group plc is a Scottish multinational engineering company headquartered in Glasgow, Scotland. It is listed on the London Stock Exchange and is a constituent of the FTSE 100 Index.

History

The company was established in 1871 as an engineering firm by two brothers, George and James Weir, founding G. & J. Weir Ltd. The Weir brothers produced numerous groundbreaking inventions in pumping equipment, primarily for the Clyde shipyards and the steam ships built there. These pumps became extremely well known for their use as boiler feedwater pumps, and for ship's auxiliary equipment such as evaporators.

Under W D Weir, the company turned to producing munitions and war materiel in the First World War. As well as shells, they manufactured aircraft including the Royal Aircraft Factory F.E.2 fighter and bomber. James George Weir (aviator, son of James Galloway Weir) a director of the company formed the Cierva Autogiro Company. G & J Weir would be a financial supporter of the company during its existence. In 1943, they provided the finances for the construction of the W.9, an experimental helicopter, to Air Ministry requirements.

The company was first listed on the London Stock Exchange in 1946. Double-acting Weir steam pumps were virtually standard fitment on British-built steamships, being used for pumping water, fuel, air and much else well into the 1950s, as well as being used on other ships worldwide. In December 1968 the Weir Group made an offer to buy the rival British pump manufacturer Worthington-Simpson, following an offer by Studebaker-Worthington.
In 1969 Studebaker-Worthington acquired Worthington-Simpson.
After some negotiation, Weir's acquired 50% of Worthington Simpson.
A new joint-venture company named Worthington Weir was set up to handle international sales of the two parent companies.

The debt taken on by Weir to acquire their share of Worthington-Simpson was denominated in Deutsche Marks, and as that currency strengthened against sterling and the dollar it became increasingly expensive to service.
Worthington-Simpson was profitable, but did not cover the cost of debt.
During the next decade Weir was forced to sell off many assets and undertook financial reorganization in 1981.
After the financial reorganization, Derald Ruttenberg and Jacob Rothschild gained effective control of 40% of the company.
Ruttenberg became a board member. At the reorganization, the 3rd Viscount Weir, who had been chairman since 1972, stepped down to vice chairman, but Lord Weir regained the chairmanship in 1983 and served until 1999.

In 1989, the company acquired Hopkinsons, an Huddersfield-based company manufacturing valves and controls.

21st century

In July 2005, Weir sold its desalination and water treatment businesses, (Weir Westgarth, Weir Entropie and Weir Envig) to Veolia Water Systems, part of the water division of Veolia Environnement: Weir Westgarth had been a pioneer of the multi-stage flash distillation process used predominantly to produce desalinated water from seawater.

In May 2007, the company sold its Glasgow-based business Weir Pumps to Jim McColl's Clyde Blowers plc, with the pump company subsequently being renamed to Clyde Pumps Ltd.

In February 2015 the company issued a profit warning predicting significant losses; the U.S. shale market had experienced a contraction, and the company had to reduce its workforce by approximately 650.

In October 2020, the company sold their oil and gas division to Caterpillar Inc. for $405 million, having already previously sold their flow control division in 2019.

In December 2010, Weir pleaded guilty to breaching UN sanctions on Iraq between 2000 and 2002. Judge Lord Carloway of The High Court in Edinburgh fined the company £3m along with a confiscation order of £13.9m.

In 2011, the company, since renamed Clyde Union Pumps, was sold to the SPX Corporation for £750 million. The business suffered heavy financial losses in the subsequent years and had to make staff redundant as the result of a long-term global downtown in the oil and gas sector.

In October 2020, the oil and gas division of the company was sold to Caterpillar Inc. for $405 million, following the sale of the company's flow control division in February 2019 to First Reserve.

People
William Weir, 1st Viscount Weir
William Weir, 3rd Viscount Weir
James Kenneth Weir, 2nd Viscount Weir
Robert Smith, Baron Smith of Kelvin
Thomas Leith

See also
 List of oilfield service companies

References

Sources

External links
 

Engineering companies of Scotland
Companies listed on the London Stock Exchange
1871 in Scotland
Manufacturing companies based in Glasgow
Companies established in 1871
Pump manufacturers